Cecropia angustifolia is a species of plant in the family Urticaceae. It is native from Mexico to South America.

References

angustifolia
Least concern plants
Plants described in 1847
Taxonomy articles created by Polbot